The 2023 League1 Ontario season is the eighth season of play for Women's Division of League1 Ontario, a Division 3 women's soccer league in the Canadian soccer league system and the highest level of soccer based in the Canadian province of Ontario.

Format
The league will run in a single table format with 19 clubs each playing each other once, with teams playing reverse fixtures from the 2022 season (if a team faced an opponent at home in 2022, they will face them on the road in 2023). With the league set to split into a multi-division format with promotion-relegation beginning in 2024, the points obtained in this season will contribute to the original placement of clubs in 2024, with the points from the 2022 season (weighted at 75%) being added to the points teams obtain in the 2023 season (weighted at 100%) to determine the placements.

The top-six teams in the regular season will qualify for the playoffs with the top-two teams receiving first round byes.

Clubs
With the exception of Pickering FC, 19 of the 20 clubs that took part in the 2022 season will participate in 2023. Because of the format changes planned for the following year, the league imposed a one-year moratorium on any new teams joining the league.

Premier Division

Playoffs

Future format and changes
Starting in 2024, the league will split into a multi-division format with promotion and relegation between them. Ten teams will take part in the first-tier League1 Premier, ten teams in the second-tier League1 Championship, and all new expansion teams as well as reserve sides in a third-tier League2 Ontario. 

The initial assignment of teams in the 2024 season is done by using the points obtained in the previous two years. The points from the 2022 season (weighted at 75%) will be added to the points teams obtain in the 2023 season (weighted at 100%) to determine the placements.

References

External links 

League1 Ontario
League1 Ontario (women) seasons
Ontario W